

69001–69100 

|-bgcolor=#f2f2f2
| colspan=4 align=center | 
|}

69101–69200 

|-id=159
| 69159 Ivanking ||  || Ivan R. King (born 1927), prominent astronomer working mainly on the studies of globular clusters. He is best known for a family of dynamical models that bear his name. He is a recipient of numerous professional honors and distinctions, including the Presidency of the American Astronomical Society. || 
|}

69201–69300 

|-id=228
| 69228 Kamerunberg || 5173 T-3 || Mount Cameroon (called Kamerunberg in German), the 4040-meter active volcano, situated in Cameroon near the Gulf of Guinea. || 
|-id=230
| 69230 Hermes || 1937 UB || Hermes, from Greek mythology, messenger of the gods, son of Zeus and Maia. His attributes are the most complex and varied of those of any of the major gods. He was a deity of wealth, god of trade and travelers, of commerce, manual skill, oratory and eloquence, of thieves and of the wind. Named by the Astronomisches Rechen-Institut. || 
|-id=231
| 69231 Alettajacobs || 1972 FE || Aletta Jacobs (1854–1929), the first Dutch woman to graduate from a university and the first Dutch female physician. She helped initiate The Hague Congress of 1915 that led to the formation of the Women's International League for Peace and Freedom. The name was suggested by L. E. Timmerman. || 
|-id=245
| 69245 Persiceto || 1981 EO || San Giovanni in Persiceto, a small Italian town near Bologna, where an enthusiastic group of amateur astronomers, with the strong support of the municipality, created the Museo del Cielo e della Terra, a large complex devoted to the popularization of the natural sciences, in particular astronomy. || 
|-id=259
| 69259 Savostyanov ||  || Savostyanov Fedor Vasil'evich (1924–2012), a Russian painter who painted portraits, landscapes, genre and battle paintings. || 
|-id=260
| 69260 Tonyjudt || 1982 TJ || Tony Judt (1948–2010), an English-American historian, essayist, and historian. He is the Erich Maria Remarque Professor in European Studies at New York University, known for his publications on Israel and France, and especially for his book Postwar: A History of Europe Since 1945. || 
|-id=261
| 69261 Philaret ||  || Philaret (Vasily Mikhailovich Drozdov, 1783–1867), metropolitan bishop of Moscow and Kolomna, was an honorary member of the Imperial Academy of Sciences, and ordinary academician in the Department of Russian Language and Literature. Name suggested by N. N. Drozdov. || 
|-id=263
| 69263 Big Ben ||  || Big Ben, at Westminster, is the name of the great bell and clock tower of the world's largest four-faced chiming clock. In May 2009 it celebrated its 150th anniversary. || 
|-id=264
| 69264 Nebra ||  || The German town of Nebra where the Nebra sky disk from the Bronze Age has been found. First documented in 876, it is located on the Unstrut river, 35 kilometers from Tautenburg, where the discovering observatory is located. || 
|-id=275
| 69275 Wiesenthal ||  || Simon Wiesenthal (1908–2005), Austro-Hungarian Nazi war criminal hunter who survived the Nazi camps of World War II. After the war, he courageously gathered data on the perpetrators of the Holocaust. He wrote several books, including I Hunted Eichmann and The Murderers Among Us. || 
|-id=286
| 69286 von Liebig ||  || Justus von Liebig (1803–1873), a German chemist and full professor who made many important contributions to the fields of inorganic and organic, biological and agricultural chemistry. Students from all over Europe came to study with him. He introduced the mineral fertilizers. || 
|-id=287
| 69287 Günthereichhorn ||  || Günther Eichhorn (born 1945), a German-American astronomer who developed and managed the Astrophysics Data System from 1992–2007. For this work he was awarded the 2008 Award for Services in Astronomy from the Royal Astronomical Society. || 
|-id=288
| 69288 Berlioz ||  || Hector Berlioz (1803–1869), French Romantic composer and critic who is known for his dramatic Symphonie fantastique and great Requiem. He is regarded as the founder of the Program music. His paper Treatise on Instrumentation served as a leading handbook for later tonalists. || 
|-id=295
| 69295 Stecklum ||  || Bringfried Stecklum (born 1954) is a German astrophysicist working on star formation with emphasis on high angular resolution measurements. In 2010 he resumed asteroid observations using the Tautenburg 1.34-m Schmidt telescope, with the main focus on near-Earth object confirmation. || 
|}

69301–69400 

|-id=311
| 69311 Russ || 1992 QC || Russell Mark Steel (born 1964), brother of Duncan Steel who discovered this minor planet || 
|-id=312
| 69312 Rogerbacon ||  || Roger Bacon (c. 1219–1292), English philosopher || 
|}

69401–69500 

|-id=406
| 69406 Martz-Kohl ||  || The US Martz-Kohl Observatory is located in Frewsburg, New York, named after Marshal Martz and Ron Kohl's, who built one of the worlds largest amateur telescopes for the observatory in the 1950s (Src). || 
|-id=421
| 69421 Keizosaji ||  || Keizo Saji (1919–1999), well-known businessmen in Japan and the honorary chief of the Saji Astro Park || 
|-id=423
| 69423 Openuni ||  || The Open University (founded 23 April 1969) is the world's leading university for flexible, innovative distance learning, having educated over 2 million part-time students. Through its research in astronomy, planetary and space science, the OU has a distinguished history of involvement in major Solar System exploration missions. || 
|-id=434
| 69434 de Gerlache ||  || Adrien de Gerlache (1866–1934), Belgian naval officer who led the Belgian Antarctic Expedition of 1897 to 1899 || 
|-id=460
| 69460 Christibarnard ||  || Christiaan Barnard (1922–2001) was a South African cardiac surgeon who performed the world's first human-to-human heart transplant in 1967 . || 
|-id=469
| 69469 Krumbenowe || 1996 WR || Krumbenowe (Chrumbenowe) is the oldest documented name of the town of Český Krumlov. Dating from the mid–13th century, the name seems to originate from German words "Krumben Ouwe", "Krumme Aue" (skew mead) or, maybe, from the much older "Wilt Ahwa" (wild water), referring to the Vltava river. || 
|-id=496
| 69496 Zaoryuzan ||  || Zao Ryuzan, a 1362-meter mountain located to the southeast of Yamagata city, Yamagata prefecture, Japan || 
|-id=500
| 69500 Ginobartali ||  || Gino Bartali (1914–2000), an Italian cyclist. || 
|}

69501–69600 

|-id=565
| 69565 Giulioscarfi ||  || Giulio Scarfì (born 1964), an Italian amateur astronomer and discoverer of minor planets, who owns the Monte Viseggi Observatory  as well as the Iota Scorpii Observatory  in Italy. His interests include asteroid photometry (rotational light-curves) and near-Earth object observations. || 
|-id=594
| 69594 Ulferika ||  || Erika (born 1940) and Ulf Lehmann (born 1939), the parents of the discoverer Gerhard Lehmann || 
|}

69601–69700 

|-bgcolor=#f2f2f2
| colspan=4 align=center | 
|}

69701–69800 

|-id=754
| 69754 Mosesmendel ||  || Moses Mendelssohn (1729–1786), German-Jewish philosopher || 
|}

69801–69900 

|-id=869
| 69869 Haining ||  || The Chinese Haining City, located at the southern tip of the Yangtze River in northern Zhejiang province || 
|-id=870
| 69870 Fizeau ||  || Hyppolite Fizeau (1819–1896), a French physicist who improved photographic processes || 
|}

69901–70000 

|-id=961
| 69961 Millosevich ||  || Elia Millosevich (1848–1919), Italian astronomer and discoverer of minor planets || 
|-id=971
| 69971 Tanzi ||  || Pepe Tanzi (born 1945), Italian lighting industrial designer || 
|-id=977
| 69977 Saurodonati ||  || Sauro Donati (born 1959), Italian amateur astronomer and discoverer of minor planets || 
|}

References 

069001-070000